Edgar Acuña, (born February 26, 1956), is a Professor of Statistics, Data Mining and Machine Learning at the University of Puerto Rico in UPRM.

Early life and education
Edgar Acuna was born on February 26, 1956, in Chincha, Peru. He started his elementary school education at Chala and it continued at Huacho. After finishing his high school in the Colegio Emblemático Luis Fabio Xammar Jurado at Huacho,  Professor Acuna continued undergraduate studies in Statistics at the National Agrarian University, UNALM in Lima, Peru, graduate studies in Applied Mathematics at the PUCP, in Lima, Peru, and doctoral studies in Statistics at the University of Rochester in Rochester, New York.

Honors
In July 2001, Acuna was considered by the Hispanic Engineer & IT magazine as one of the scientists to watch. In July 2003, he was considered by the same magazine among the Hispanic Power Hitters in Technology and Business. In 2009, was selected as Fulbright Scholar to visit Peruvian Universities.

Selected publications
Acuna is the author of "Statistical Analysis using Minitab" (written in Spanish) and published by Wiley and Sons in 2002.

He has several publications in data pre-processing for data mining and machine learning. In particular, in handling of missing values, outlier detection, and feature selection. Acuna along with his research group has developed the dprep library written in the R language. This library contains several R functions to perform data-peprocessing tasks.

References

External links 
Edgar Acuna's website

Peruvian academics
Living people
1956 births
University of Rochester alumni
University of Puerto Rico faculty